"I Was Made to Love Her" is a soul music song recorded by American musician Stevie Wonder for Motown's Tamla label in 1967. The song was written by Wonder, his mother Lula Mae Hardaway, Sylvia Moy, and producer Henry Cosby and included on Wonder's 1967 album I Was Made to Love Her.

Released as a single, "I Was Made to Love Her" peaked at No. 2 on the Billboard Pop Singles chart in July 1967. The song was held out of the top spot by "Light My Fire" by the Doors and spent four non-consecutive weeks at No. 1 on the Hot Rhythm & Blues Singles chart in the United States. The song reached No. 5 in the UK, Wonder's first top ten hit in that country.

Cash Box called it a "driving, wailing, pulsing R&B workout."

When asked in a 1968 interview which of his songs stood out in his mind, Wonder answered "'I Was Made to Love Her' because it's a true song". The last lyric line "You know Stevie ain't gonna leave her" was ad libbed by Wonder.

Personnel
Stevie Wonder – lead vocals, clavinet, harmonica
The Andantes – backing vocals
Instrumentation by the Funk Brothers
James Jamerson – bass
Benny Benjamin – drums
Eddie Willis – guitar

Charts
Weekly charts

Year-end charts

References

External links
 

1967 singles
Stevie Wonder songs
Songs written by Henry Cosby
Songs written by Sylvia Moy
Songs written by Lula Mae Hardaway
Songs written by Stevie Wonder
Motown singles
1967 songs